The Vietnam People's Armed Forces are the armed forces of the Socialist Republic of Vietnam, directly under the command of the Central Military Commission of the Communist Party of Vietnam (for which it serves as the Party's armed wing). It consists of 3 components: the People's Army of Vietnam which is the military forces of Vietnam, Vietnam People's Public Security which is the police and law enforcement of Vietnam and Vietnam Self-Defence Militia which is the militia of Vietnam.

People's Army of Vietnam

The People's Army of Vietnam (Vietnamese: Quân đội nhân dân Việt Nam) is the army of Vietnam. The PAVN includes: the Vietnam People's Ground Force, (Special Forces of Vietnam), the Vietnam People's Navy (including Naval Infantry (Vietnam), Naval Special Operation Force (Vietnam) and Naval Air Force (Vietnam)), the Vietnam People's Air Force, the Vietnam Border Guard and the Vietnam Coast Guard.

Vietnam People's Public Security

The Vietnam People's Public Security (Vietnamese: Công an nhân dân Việt Nam) is the main police and security force of Vietnam.

The People's Public Security Forces is the core force of the people's armed forces in performing the task of protecting national security and ensuring social order and safety, and crime prevention and control.

The People's Public Security Forces has the functions, tasks, organization, command, and ensures that the operation, service regimes, and regimes and policies of the People's Police comply with the provisions of the Law on People's Public Security and regulations of the People's Public Security other provisions of relevant laws. The State builds a revolutionary, regular, elite, and step-by-step modernized People's Police; prioritize the modernization of some forces. The People's Public Security Forces shall coordinate with the People's Army and Militia and Self-Defense in performing national defense tasks. The coordination between the People's Public Security and the People's Army and Militia and Self-Defense shall comply with the Government's regulations.

Vietnam Militia and Self-Defense 

The Vietnam Self-Defence Militia (Vietnamese: Dân quân tự vệ) is the militia of Vietnam.

Militia and Self-Defense forces are mass armed forces that cannot separate from production and work; is the force protecting the Party, the government, the people's lives and properties, and the State's property in the locality and grassroots; ready to fight, to serve in combat, to be the core of the fight against the enemy in the locality and grassroots when there is a war; participate in building the all-people national defense, defense sector, civil defense, protect national security and ensure social order and safety, fight against crime. The State builds a strong and widespread Militia and Self-Defense force. The organization, tasks, service regime and regimes and policies of the Vietnam Militia and Self-Defense shall comply with the provisions of the Law on Militia and Self-Defense and other relevant laws.

References

External links

Military of Vietnam